Bryant is a neighborhood within the Powderhorn community in Minneapolis, Minnesota, United States. Its boundaries are East 38th Street to the north, Chicago Avenue to the east, East 42nd Street to the south, and Interstate 35W to the west.

The neighborhood was named for William Cullen Bryant, an American poet who lived from 1794 to 1878.

The City of Minneapolis incorporated the neighborhood in 1887, and by 1930 it was fully developed. Today it is a residential neighborhood with mostly single-family dwellings. In 2000, is population was 2,789. Phelps Park, which is located within its boundaries, is home to a large Boys and Girls Club.

In 1997, Mixed Blood Theatre Company produced a play called In the Garden..., which was performed at Phelps Park. The play, written by local playwright Syl Jones, was based on interviews of neighborhood residents and was centered on the Bryant Unity Development Garden as a source of community restoration.

Bryant Neighborhood is located entirely within the bounds of Minnesota Senate District 62. It is in the 5th Precinct of the 8th Ward.

Notable residents include Andrea Jenkins.

References

External links
Bryant Neighborhood Website
Minneapolis Neighborhood Profile - Bryant 
Bryant Neighborhood Organization @ Neighborhood Link

Neighborhoods in Minneapolis
Populated places established in 1887